The 1931 Centenary Gentlemen football team was an American football team that represented the Centenary College of Louisiana as a member of the Southern Intercollegiate Athletic Association (SIAA) during the 1931 college football season. In their ninth year under head coach Homer Norton, the team compiled a 5–5 record.

Schedule

References

Centenary
Centenary Gentlemen football seasons
Centenary Gentlemen football